Seowon-gu is a non-autonomous district in the city of Cheongju in North Chungcheong Province, South Korea. Seowon-gu was established from a part of Heungdeok-gu and a part of Cheongwon-gun in July 2014.

Administrative divisions 
Seowon-gu is divided into 2 townships (myeon) and 9 neighborhoods (dong).

References

External links 
 

Districts of Cheongju
2014 establishments in South Korea
States and territories established in 2014